Bellony may refer to:

 Vernice Bellony, Dominican politician and teacher
 Bellony Cave, a cave in Haiti

See also 
 Baloney (disambiguation)
 Bellamy (disambiguation)
 Bellona (disambiguation)
 Bellone